Holiday Island is a business simulation video game developed by German games design company Sunflowers. Much of the game play involves juggling funds to build hotels, accommodation, leisure activities and restaurants. The number and location of these is important, as is the interconnectivity between different facilities. There are also other people like the player constructing and starting businesses in the island. The player can hire a Mafia style hitman to ruin the other people's businesses.

External links

1996 video games
Business simulation games
City-building games
Video games developed in Germany
Windows games
Windows-only games